Love, or more uncommon Lowe, is a Swedish version of the French name Louis. It can also be a version of Lovisa, and can thus be used both for men and women, although it is more common with men.

The name is uncommon amongst adults; there are fewer than 200 men older than 30 in Sweden with the name, but several hundreds from every cohort born in the 1990s. 31 December 2009, there was in total 6,058 men in Sweden with the name Love/Lowe, of which 2,953 had it as first name, the rest as middle name. There were also 531 women with the name, of which 128 had it as their given name.

In 2003, 344 boys got the name, and of those, 182 got it as given name. The same year, 24 girls got the name, of which 6 got it as given name. 

The name day in Sweden is 2 October (1986-1992: 3 December; 1993-2000: 26 November).

Persons with the name Love or Lowe
 Love Ablish (born 1982), Indian first-class cricketer
 Carl Jonas Love Almqvist (1793-1866), author, romantic poet, early feminist, realist, composer, social critic, and traveler
 Love Antell (born 1980), Swedish-Finnish singer and artist
 Love Gantt (1875–1935), American physician
 Melissa Love (1978-1999), American country singer
 Jennifer Love Hewitt (born 1979), American actress, singer, songwriter, producer, and director
 Augustus Edward Hough Love (1863-1940), English mathematician, geologist

References 
SCB

Swedish masculine given names
Swedish feminine given names
Unisex given names

pl:Miłość (imię)